Henri Chammartin (30 July 1918 – 30 May 2011) was a Swiss equestrian who won an individual gold medal in dressage at the 1964 Summer Olympics in Tokyo.

In 1968, he and fellow equestrian Gustav Fischer both became the second Swiss sportspersons to compete at five Olympic Games. (The first was middle-distance runner Paul Martin.) At the Summer Olympics of 1968 made in Mexico City, his last Olympics, won his fifth medal: a bronze medal in team competition, finishing ninth in addition to the individual test.

He won five medals in total at the European Dressage Championships including two individual gold medals in 1963 and 1965.

Following Chammartin's death, the International Equestrian Federation noted that he will be remembered as "a legend in the dressage world".

See also
 List of athletes with the most appearances at Olympic Games

References

1918 births
2011 deaths
Swiss male equestrians
Swiss dressage riders
Olympic equestrians of Switzerland
Equestrians at the 1952 Summer Olympics
Equestrians at the 1956 Summer Olympics
Equestrians at the 1960 Summer Olympics
Equestrians at the 1964 Summer Olympics
Equestrians at the 1968 Summer Olympics
Olympic gold medalists for Switzerland
Olympic silver medalists for Switzerland
Olympic bronze medalists for Switzerland
Olympic medalists in equestrian
Medalists at the 1968 Summer Olympics
Medalists at the 1964 Summer Olympics
Medalists at the 1956 Summer Olympics
Medalists at the 1952 Summer Olympics
20th-century Swiss people